Kambiz Dirbaz (Persian:کامبیز دیرباز, born September 3, 1975) is an Iranian actor. He is best known for his acting in Duel (2006), The Outcast (2007), In the Eye of the Wind (2009–2010) and Michael (2015). He has received various accolades, including a Crystal Simorgh.

Career 
He was awarded the Crystal Simorgh for Best Actor in a Supporting Role at the Fajr International Film Festival for Duel in 2004. Other noted roles include Majid, the martyr in The Outcast (2007), and an almost silent role in Parviz Shahbazi's Karat 14 (2009). On television, he has appeared in Cold Fever, No Pain, No Gain, In the Eye of the Wind, Michael, in which he played the title character. He also had a cameo role in the controversial series Gando (2019).

Filmography

Film

Web

Television

Awards and nominations

References

External links
 

1975 births
Living people
People from Tehran
Iranian male film actors
Iranian male stage actors
Iranian male television actors
Islamic Azad University alumni
Crystal Simorgh for Best Supporting Actor winners